Youssef Tabti (born in Paris) is a French concept artist with Algerian roots.

Biography 
Youssef Tabti lives in Hamburg since 1994, having resided in several towns: Paris, Montpellier, Berlin, but always with Hamburg as his permanent place of residence. He studied art and art history in Paris and began with his first works in 1992, installations and photography.

Exhibitions (selection) 
 2015: Psychogeographic Junction.  / Kunsthalle Bratislava LAB. Slovak Republic. 
 2014: Dissonant Archives. Oslo10 Basel Switzerland. 
 2013: X-Border Biennial.Luleå-Rovaniemi-Severomorsk/Sweden, Russia, Finland. 
 2011: Focus 11.Contemporary Art Africa, Basel. Switzerland. 
 2010: Manifesta 8 "Evento Paralelo", Murcia Spain
 2010: Siemens Sanat.„Other Worlds“, Istanbul, 2010 European Capital of Culture. Turkey
 2009: La Force de l’Art 02. Le Grand-Palais.Invitation from C.Tanc/F.Vincent, Paris, France
 2009: Literaturhaus Hamburg. “Edvards Tag”, Hamburg, Germany. 
 2008: Kunstverein Hamburg. "We call it Hamburg", Hamburg, Germany
 2008: Deutsches Schauspiehaus Hamburg.Stage for the Oper "Polynymph", Hamburg, Germany
 2007: 10th. Internationale Istanbul Biennale.“Nightcomers“, Istanbul, Turkey

Awards, Artist-in-residence and Nominations
 2015 Residency at the Embassy of Foreign Artists. State of Geneva, Switzerland 
 2013 ZK/U Center for Art and Urbanistics, Berlin. Germany 
 2013 Stiftung Künstlerdorf Schöppingen, North Rhine-Westphalia. Germany 
 2012: Nominated for the Abraaj Capital Art Prize 2013
 2010: Altona Art Prize
 2008 Künstlerhaus Lauenburg/Elbe, Lauenburg/Elbe, Schleswig-Holstein. Germany 
 2001 Les Verrières - Résidences-ateliers de Pont-Aven, France 
 1998/99 Les Verrières - Résidences-ateliers de Pont-Aven, France
 1995:   Château de la Napoule. Napoule Art Foundation, France

References

External links 
 
 Youssef Tabti at ARTnews
 Youssef Tabti at Creative Africa Network

1968 births
Living people
French conceptual artists
French people of Algerian descent
French people of Kabyle descent